The AI Memos are a series of influential memorandums and technical reports published by the MIT AI Lab, Massachusetts Institute of Technology, United States. They cover Artificial Intelligence, a field of computer science.

Noteworthy memos in the series include:

 AI Memo 39, "The New Compiler", describing the first implementation of a self-hosting compiler (for LISP 1.5)
 AI Memo 41, "A Chess Playing Program", describing Kotok-McCarthy, the first computer program to play chess convincingly
 AI Memo 239 (1972), also known as HAKMEM, a compendium of hacks and algorithms
 Sussman and Steele's Lambda Papers:
 AI Memo 349 (1975), "Scheme: An Interpreter for Extended Lambda Calculus"
 AI Memo 353 (1976), "Lambda: The Ultimate Imperative"
 AI Memo 379 (1976), "Lambda: The Ultimate Declarative"
 AI Memo 443 (1977), "Debunking the 'Expensive Procedure Call' Myth, or, Procedure Call Implementations Considered Harmful, or, Lambda: The Ultimate GOTO"
 AI Memo 453 (1978), "The Art of the Interpreter of, the Modularity Complex (Parts Zero, One, and Two)"
 AI Technical Report 474 (1978), "RABBIT: A Compiler for SCHEME"
 AI Memo 514 (1979), "Design of LISP-based Processors, or SCHEME: A Dielectric LISP, or Finite Memories Considered Harmful, or LAMBDA: The Ultimate Opcode"

References

External links 
 AI Memos (1959–2004) collection at DSpace at MIT
 AI Series historical archive at the CSAIL Publications and Digital Archive

Computer science papers
Massachusetts Institute of Technology
Artificial intelligence publications
History of artificial intelligence
Memoranda